South Vazhakulam is a small town in between Aluva and Perumbavoor on Aluva-Munnar State Highway(SH-16). South Vazhakulam represents Vazhakulam Village, Vazhakulam Panchayat & Vazhakulam Block. Vazhakulam, which was traditionally a farming village has changed to an industrial area with many big and small industrial units and large warehouses operating in and around Vazhakulam. South Vazhakulam is the major shopping area for the residents between Aluva and Perumbavoor towns. South Vazhakulam is preferred by many people from across the state to settle down since it is located in the suburb of Kochi and is well connected to major towns, airport, railway station, and multi-specialty hospital. People following different religious beliefs live together in harmony. Also, the crime rate is very low. Periyar Valley Irrigation Main Canal flows through Vazhakulam and so the land is supplied with water even during summer.

Industries 
AVT Natural Products
Mc Cormick
V-Star
Aizar Pipes
Hycount
Akay Flavours & Aromatics
Godrej Agrovet
New Glory Orthopedics 
Plywood units
Cashewnut Factory

Warehouses
Reliance 
Logiware
Indus Towers
Parle Products
Kerala State Rubber Marketing Federation

Religious Centers
Sasthamangalam Temple
Vazhakulam Juma Masjid
Infant Jesus Church Syro-Malabar Church
St. Mary's Church Jacobite Church
Chettiyath Bhagavathi Temple
Ethyerikavu Bhagavathi Temple
Ebenezer Marthoma Church

Educational Institutions
Vazhakulam Govt. Higher Secondary School
Holy Crescent College of Architecture
MES College Marampally
TMJ Public School

Major Shops/Institutions
Catholic Syrian Bank 
South Indian Bank
St George Medicals- Pharmacy
!hub Mobile shop  
Alpha printers
Aluva Steels & Hardwares
Labyrintha Electricals & Hardwares
Mekkattu Trading Co.
Alpha Business Center
Shahana Textiles
Pulz Gents Wears
Stoxx Factory Outlet
Hotel Shamna
CKK Vegetable Wholesale
Ragam Provision Stores
Royal Bakery & Food Court
Vazhakulam Oil Mill
Keralasree Agencies
Elegance Hotel & Bar
123 Chappel Bazar

Economy 
South Vazhakulam is known for small scale industries and warehouses. It accommodates one of the largest warehouses in the state. There are many small size industries and trading concerns located in and around South Vazhakulam town.

Etymology
Vazhakkulam comes from 'vazha' which means banana in Malayalam and 'kulam' which means pond in Malayalam.  There were a lot of banana plantations in olden times and there were many ponds to irrigate these plantations.  That can be the reason for this pretty name of the village.

Administration
It represents Vazhakulam Block and Vazhakulam Panchayat in Kunnathunadu Taluk, Ernakulam District in the Indian state of Kerala.

Villages and suburbs
Marampally, Vazhakkulam, Sreemulanagaram, Vengola, Keezhmadu, Edathala and Kizhakkambalam.

Location

References 

Villages in Ernakulam district